The 2018 Challenger ATP Cachantún Cup was a professional tennis tournament played on red clay courts. It was the 11th edition of the tournament which was part of the 2018 ATP Challenger Tour. It took place in Santiago, Chile between 5 and 10 March 2018.

Singles main-draw entrants

Seeds

 1 Rankings are as of 26 February 2018.

Other entrants
The following players received wildcards into the singles main draw:
  Marcelo Tomás Barrios Vera
  Christian Garín
  Gonzalo Lama
  Alejandro Tabilo

The following player received entry into the singles main draw as an alternate:
  Peđa Krstin

The following players received entry from the qualifying draw:
  Facundo Argüello
  Pedro Cachín
  Carlos Gómez-Herrera
  Gian Marco Moroni

The following players received entry as lucky losers:
  Hernán Casanova
  João Souza

Champions

Singles

 Marco Cecchinato def.  Carlos Gómez-Herrera 1–6, 6–1, 6–1.

Doubles

 Romain Arneodo /  Jonathan Eysseric def.  Guido Andreozzi /  Guillermo Durán 7–6(7–4), 1–6, [12–10].

References

Challenger ATP Cachantún Cup
Cachantún Cup (ATP)
Cach